Wanakuni (Aymara wanaku, wanaqu guanaco, -ni Aymara suffix to indicate ownership, "the one with the guanaco", Hispanicized spelling Huanacune) is a mountain in the Andes of Peru, about  high. It is situated in the Cusco Region, Quispicanchi Province, Marcapata District. Wanakuni lies southwest of Machu Apachita and northwest of Piki Mach'ay. The little lake of the mountain is named Q'umirqucha.

References 

Mountains of Cusco Region
Mountains of Peru